Paulo Henrique Martins Costa, known simply as Paulo Henrique (born September 11, 1989 in Ivinhema, Mato Grosso do Sul), is a Brazilian football right back, who currently plays for Atlético Goianiense.

Career
Paulo Henrique was signed by Palmeiras on May 19, 2011.

Career statistics
As of end of the 2011 season

References

External links
 palmeiras official website

1989 births
Living people
Brazilian footballers
Paraná Clube players
Sociedade Esportiva Palmeiras players
Atlético Clube Goianiense players
Association football defenders
Sportspeople from Mato Grosso do Sul